Quade Green (born May 12, 1998) is an American professional basketball player who most recently played for the Oklahoma City Blue of the NBA G League. He played college basketball for the Washington Huskies and the Kentucky Wildcats.

High school career
Green attended Saints John Neumann and Maria Goretti Catholic High School in Philadelphia, Pennsylvania, where he won four consecutive Pennsylvania Class 3A state championships.

Green finished his career at Neumann-Goretti with 1,853 points, which ranks second in program history.

In 2016, Green played in the summer for the PSA Cardinals in the Nike EYBL and helped lead his team to a berth in the 2016 Nike Peach Jam.
He was named to the All-EYBL first team after averaging 14.1 points and 10.5 assists.

In January 2017, Green was selected as a McDonald's All-American.

Green won the Legends and Stars Shootout competition during the 2017 McDonald's All-American Game.

In February 2017, Green was selected to participate in the Jordan Brand Classic.

Recruiting
On November 16, 2016, Green committed to attend and play for the University of Kentucky.

College career
As a freshman, Green posted 9.3 points and 2.7 assists per game while shooting 37.6 percent from behind the arc. He started 13 of the first 14 games before missing three straight games due to injury. He moved to a bench role after returning from injury. Green scored in double figures eight times in 20 games after returning. Green returned to Kentucky for his sophomore season despite rumors of transferring.

On December 11, he announced he would be transferring from the University of Kentucky. On January 4, 2019, he was welcomed to the University of Washington basketball program. In January 2020 it was announced that Green was ruled academically ineligible for the winter quarter and could possibly return for the postseason. He averaged 11.6 points, 5.3 assists, 2.6 rebounds and 1.1 steals per game while shooting 51.4 percent from the floor and 44.7 percent from 3-point range in 15 games.

Professional career

Maine Celtics (2021)
After going undrafted in the 2021 NBA draft, Green signed on October 23, 2021, with the Maine Celtics of the NBA G League. He was waived on December 9.

Lakeland Magic (2021)
On December 21, 2021, the Lakeland Magic claimed Green from the G League available player pool and played two games for the team.

Grand Rapids Gold (2021–2022)
On December 30, 2021, Green was acquired by the Grand Rapids Gold of the NBA G League.

Oklahoma City Blue (2022–2023)
On November 21, 2022, Green was acquired by the Oklahoma City Blue. On January 2, 2023, Green was waived.

National team career
Green was named to the 2017 USA Junior National Select Team that played in the 20th annual Nike Hoop Summit but was unable to play in the game due to injury.

Green won a gold medal with USA Basketball at the 2016 FIBA Americas U18 Championship. Green averaged 4.6 points, 2.6 assists, and 1.8 rebounds in five games.

Green participated in the 2016 USA Men's Junior National Team October minicamp.

Career statistics

College

|-
| style="text-align:left;"| 2017–18
| style="text-align:left;"| Kentucky
| 34 || 13 || 25.6 || .451 || .376 || .808 || 1.8 || 2.7 || .3 || .0 || 9.3
|-
| style="text-align:left;"| 2018–19
| style="text-align:left;"| Kentucky
| 9 || 0 || 17.8 || .449 || .423 || .895 || 1.3 || 2.3 || 1.0 || .0 || 8.0
|-
| style="text-align:left;"| 2019–20
| style="text-align:left;"| Washington
| 15 || 14 || 30.4 || .514 || .447 || .837 || 2.6 || 5.3 || 1.1 || .0 || 11.6
|-
| style="text-align:left;"| 2020–21
| style="text-align:left;"| Washington
| 25 || 22 || 31.7 || .428 || .313 || .868 || 3.0 || 3.6 || 1.1 || .0 || 15.4
|- class="sortbottom"
| style="text-align:center;" colspan="2"| Career
|| 83 || 49 || 27.4 || .450 || .367 || .847 || 2.2 || 3.4 || .8 || .0 || 11.4

References

External links
Washington Huskies bio
Kentucky Wildcats bio
USA Basketball bio

1998 births
Living people
21st-century African-American sportspeople
African-American basketball players
American men's basketball players
Basketball players from Philadelphia
Grand Rapids Gold players
Kentucky Wildcats men's basketball players
Lakeland Magic players
Maine Celtics players
McDonald's High School All-Americans
Oklahoma City Blue players
Point guards
Washington Huskies men's basketball players